Events in the year 1895 in music.

Specific locations
1895 in Norwegian music

Events 
March 4 – Gustav Mahler conducts the première of his Symphony No. 2, "Resurrection" in [Berlin] – the first three movements only.
May 18 – Australian contralto Ada Crossley makes her London début at the Queen's Hall.
August 10 – The first ever indoor promenade concert, origin of The Proms, is held at the Queen's Hall in London, opening a series promoted by impresario Robert Newman with 26-year-old Henry Wood as sole conductor. The first concert opens with the overture to Wagner's Rienzi. The orchestra tunes to the "French A" or diapason normal concert pitch.
December 13 – The first complete performance of Gustav Mahler's Symphony No. 2, in Berlin with the composer conducting the Berlin Philharmonic orchestra (first three movements premièred on March 4).
unknown dates
Composer Sidney Homer marries contralto Louise Dilworth Beatty.
Composer Zdeněk Fibich separates from his wife, the contralto Betty Fibichová, and goes to live with his former student and lover Anežka Schulzová.
Venezuelan pianist, singer and composer Teresa Carreño divorces her husband, pianist Eugen d'Albert. It marks the end of her third marriage and his second.

Published popular music 

 "America the Beautiful"     w. Katherine Lee Bates m. Samuel A. Ward
 "The Band Played On"     w. John F. Palmer m. Charles B. Ward
 "The Belle of Avenoo A"     w.m. Safford Waters
 "Down In Poverty Row"     w. Gussie L. Davis m. Arthur Trevelyan
 "A Dream"     w. Charles B. Cory m. J. C. Bartlett
 "The Hand That Rocks The Cradle"     w. Charles W. Berkeley m. William H. Holmes
 "He's Not Dead Yet!"     w. T. W. Connor
 "It's a Great Big Shame"     w. Edgar Bateman m. George Le Brunn
 "Just Tell Them That You Saw Me"     w.m. Paul Dresser
 "King Cotton (march)"     m. John Philip Sousa
 "La Pas Ma La"  w.m. Ernest Hogan
 "My Angeline"     w. Harry B. Smith m. Victor Herbert
 "My Best Girl's a New Yorker"     w.m. John Stromberg
 "Put Me Off at Buffalo"     w. Harry Dillon m. John Dillon (Dillon Brothers)
 "Rastus on Parade"     w. George Marion m. Kerry Mills
 "She Was One of the Early Birds"     w.m. T. W. Connor
 "Sleep Little Rosebud"  w. Alfred Bryant, m. Louis Campbell Tipton
 "The Soldiers of the Queen"     w.m. Leslie Stuart
 "The Streets of Cairo"     w.m. James Thornton
 "The Sunshine of Paradise Alley"     w. Walter H. Ford m. John Walter Bratton

Recorded popular music 

"Girl Wanted"  –  Dan W. Quinn, Berliner Records
"The Band Played On"  –  Dan W. Quinn, Columbia Records
"The Sidewalks of New York"  –  Dan W. Quinn, Berliner Records

Classical music 
Béla Bartók
Capriccio in B minor, for piano, Op. 4
Fantasia in A minor, for piano, Op. 2
Fantasia, for violin, Op. 9
Pieces, for violin, Op. 7
Sonata No. 2 in F major, for piano, Op. 3
Sonata in C minor, for violin and piano, Op. 5
Sonata No. 3 in C major, for piano, Op. 6
Léon Boëllmann – Suite Gothique for Organ
Antonín Dvořák – Cello Concerto in B minor,  thirteenth and fourteenth string quartets
Edward Elgar – From the Bavarian Highlands, for chorus and orchestra, Op. 27
George Enescu – "Study" Symphony No. 1 in D minor
Gabriel Fauré
Allegro symphonique, for piano four-hands, Op. 68
Barcarolle No. 6 in E-flat major, for piano, Op. 70
Theme and Variations, for piano, Op. 73
Anatoly Lyadov
Etude in F major, for piano, Op. 37
Mazurka in F major, for piano, Op. 38
Preludes (3), for piano, Op. 36
Preludes (4), for piano, Op. 39
Henrique Oswald – Piano Quintet in C major, Op. 18
Camille Saint-Saëns
Fantasy No. 2 in D major, for organ, Op. 101
La Mort de Thaïs, Paraphrase de concert sur l'opéra de J. Massenet, for piano
Souvenir d'Ismaïlia, for piano, Op. 100
Richard Strauss
Songs (3), for high voice and piano, Op. 29
Till Eulenspiegel's Merry Pranks, for orchestra, Op. 28
Alexander von Zemlinsky – Serenade (Suite), for violin and piano

Opera
Isaac Albéniz – Henry Clifford
Enrique Fernández Arbós – El Centro de la Tierra
Nikolai Rimsky-Korsakov – Christmas Eve, 10 December, in St. Petersburg.

Musical theater
 An Artist's Model     London production opened at Daly's Theatre on February 2 and ran for 392 performances
 Dandy Dick Whittington     London production
 The Shop Girl     Broadway production opened at Palmer's Theatre on October 28 and ran for 72 performances
 The Tyrolean     London production

Births
January 7 – Clara Haskil, pianist (died 1960)
January 27 – Buddy De Sylva, songwriter (died 1950)
February 7 – Irving Aaronson, jazz pianist and big band leader (died 1963)
February 28 – Guiomar Novaes, Brazilian pianist (died 1979)
March 4 – Bjarne Brustad, Norwegian composer and violinist (died 1978)
March 23 – Dane Rudhyar, composer (died 1985)
March 31 – Lizzie Miles, singer (died 1963)
April 1 – Alberta Hunter, singer (died 1984)
April 3
Mario Castelnuovo-Tedesco, composer (died 1968)
Zez Confrey, pianist and composer (died 1971)
April 9 – Mance Lipscomb, popular singer (died 1976)
April 23 – Jimmie Noone, jazz musician
April 29 – Sir Malcolm Sargent, conductor (died 1967)
May 1 – Leo Sowerby, composer (died 1968)
May 2 – Lorenz Hart, US lyricist (died 1943)
May 6 – Rudolph Valentino, dancer and actor (died 1926)
May 11 – William Grant Still, composer (died 1978)
June 10 – Hattie McDaniel, singer and actress (died 1952)
June 16 – Lew Pollack, US composer (died 1946)
June 21 – Mark Reizen, Soviet opera singer (died 1992)
July 4 – Irving Caesar, US lyricist and librettist (died 1996)
July 5 – Gordon Jacob, English composer (died 1984)
July 10 – Carl Orff, German composer (died 1982)
July 12 
 Kirsten Flagstad, Norwegian soprano (died 1982)
 Oscar Hammerstein II, lyricist (died 1960)
July 13 – Bradley Kincaid, folk singer (died 1989)
July 25 – Yvonne Printemps, singer and actress (died 1977)
August 6 – Ernesto Lecuona, Cuban composer (died 1963)
August 10 – Harry Richman, US singer, actor and composer (died 1972)
August 13 – Bert Lahr, vaudeville performer (died 1967)
September 9 – Harry Tobias, US lyric writer (died 1994)
September 16 – Karol Rathaus, Austrian (Ukrainian) composer (died 1954)
September 22 – Herbert Janssen, German baritone (died 1965)
October 11 – Jakov Gotovac, Croatian composer and conductor (died 1982)
October 12 – Tubby Hall, jazz drummer (died 1945)
October 17 – Doris Humphrey, dancer (died 1958)
October 29 – Harry Ruby, songwriter (died 1974)
November 5 – Walter Gieseking, German pianist and composer
November 16 – Paul Hindemith, German composer (died 1963)
November 28
José Iturbi, pianist (died 1980)
Jacobo Rubalcaba, Cuban musician and bandleader (died 1960)
November 29 – Busby Berkeley, film director, choreographer (died 1976)
November 30 – Johann Nepomuk David, composer (died 1977)
December 2 – Harriet Cohen, pianist (died 1967)
December 16 – Andy Razaf, composer, poet and lyricist (died 1973)

Deaths
January 10 – Benjamin Godard, composer (born 1849)
January 22 – Edward Solomon, pianist, conductor and composer (born 1855) (typhoid)
February 6 – Otto Mahler, composer (born 1873) (suicide)
February 16 – Fredrik August Dahlgren, songwriter (born 1816)
February 24 – Ignaz Lachner, conductor and composer (born 1807)
March 16 – Richard Corney Grain, entertainer and songwriter (born 1844) (influenza)
March 18 – Priscilla Horton, singer and actress (born 1818)
April 28 – Jean Joseph Bott, violinist and composer (born 1826)
May 21 – Franz von Suppé, composer (born 1819)
June 15 – Richard Genée, librettist and composer (born 1823)
June 28 – Ján Koehler, operatic baritone
July 13 – John Tiplady Carrodus, violinist (born 1836)
August 2 – Ernest Appy, US cellist and composer (born 1834)
August 6 – George Frederick Root, US composer (born 1820)
August 13 – Ludwig Abel, violinist, composer and conductor (born 1834)
October 12 – Cecil Frances Alexander, hymn-writer (born 1818)
October 25 – Charles Hallé, pianist and conductor (born 1819)
November – Raffaele Mirate, operatic tenor (born 1815)
November 1 – Aleksander Zarzycki, pianist, conductor and composer (born 1834)
date unknown
Charles Albrecht, composer of the national anthem of Monaco (born 1817)
Basilio Basili, operatic tenor and composer (born 1804)
Angelique Magito, opera and concert singer (born 1809)
Nipper, the dog on the HMV record label (born 1884)

References

 
1890s in music
19th century in music
Music by year